The Consolidated C-87 Liberator Express was a transport derivative of the B-24 Liberator heavy bomber built during World War II for the United States Army Air Forces. A total of 287 C-87s were officially delivered from Consolidated Aircraft plant in Fort Worth, Texas. The plant also developed and delivered a USAAF flight engineer trainer designated as the AT-22.  The AAF C-87A was an executive transport version of the C-87.  The United States Navy VIP transport designated as the RY.  The last development was a Navy contracted, single tail version with an extended fuselage. Built in San Diego, its USN designation was RY-3 and the AAF had order the design as the C-87C. Those were cancelled and allotted to a Royal Air Force VIP transport designated as the Liberator C.IX

In contrast, the C-109 Liberator  was a fuel-transport converted from existing B-24 Bombers.

Design and development
The C-87 was hastily designed in early 1942 to fulfill the need for a heavy cargo and personnel transport with longer range and better high-altitude performance than the C-47 Skytrain, the most widely available United States Army Air Forces transport aircraft at the time. Production began in 1942.

The first C-87 prototype was 41–11608.  The design included various modifications, including the elimination of gun turrets and other armament along with the installation of a strengthened cargo floor, including a floor running through the bomb bay. The glazed nose of the bombardier compartment of the B-24 was replaced by a hinged metal cap to allow for loading the nose compartment, which in the bomber version can only be reached through a crawlspace under the cockpit floor.  A cargo door was added to the port side of the fuselage, just forward of the tail, and a row of windows was fitted along the sides of the fuselage.

The C-87 could be fitted with removable seats and racks to carry personnel or litters in place of cargo. Because of war production bottlenecks and shortages, many C-87 aircraft were fitted with turbosuperchargers producing lower boost pressure and thus unable to sustain power at the same altitudes as those fitted to B-24s destined for combat use, and ceiling and climb rate were accordingly adversely affected.

C-87A VIP transport
In 1942 and 1943, several C-87 aircraft were converted into VIP luxury passenger transports by adding insulation, padded seats, dividers, and other accommodations.  The modified aircraft was capable of carrying 16 passengers, and given the designation C-87A.  One C-87A in particular, serial 41-24159, was exclusively converted in 1943 to a presidential VIP transport, the Guess Where II, intended to carry President Franklin D. Roosevelt on international trips.  Had it been accepted, it would have been the first aircraft to be used in presidential service, i.e. the first Air Force One.  However, the Secret Service, after a review of the C-87's controversial safety record in service, flatly refused to approve the Guess Where II for presidential carriage. The Guess Where II was then used to transport senior members of the Roosevelt administration.  In March 1944, the Guess Where II transported Eleanor Roosevelt on a goodwill tour of several Latin American countries.

XC-87B
A damaged B-24D, 42-40355 became what is referred to as the XC-87B with an extended fuselage and low altitude engine packages. This transport, "Pinocchio" as it was known, was later converted to a single tailfin with Privateer-type engine packages. This should not be confused with the cancelled XC-87B project which proposed an armed transport.

Operational history

Most C-87s were operated by the U.S. Air Transport Command and flown by formerly civilian crews from U.S. civil transport carriers. The planes were initially used on transoceanic routes too long to be flown by the C-47. After the Japanese invasion of Burma in 1942, the C-87 was used for flying war material from India to American and Chinese forces over "The Hump", the treacherous air route that crossed the Himalayas. When the route was established, the C-87 was the only readily available American transport with high-altitude performance good enough to fly this route while carrying a large cargo load.

The C-87 was plagued by numerous problems and suffered from a poor reputation among its crews. Veteran airline pilot and author Ernest K. Gann, in his 1961 memoir Fate is the Hunter, wrote: "They were an evil bastard contraption, nothing like the relatively efficient B-24 except in appearance." Complaints centered around electrical and hydraulic system failures in extreme cold at high altitudes, a disconcertingly frequent loss of all cockpit illumination during takeoffs, and a flight deck heating system that either produced stifling heat or did not function at all.

The C-87 did not climb well when heavily loaded, a dangerous characteristic when flying out of the unimproved, rain-soaked airfields of India and China; many were lost on takeoff with the loss of just a single engine. Gann's book recounts a near-collision with the Taj Mahal after takeoff in a heavily loaded C-87 when full flaps had to be hastily deployed to increase the aircraft's altitude to avoid the edifice. The aircraft's auxiliary long-range fuel tanks were linked by improvised and often leaky fuel lines that crisscrossed the crew compartment, choking flight crews with noxious gasoline fumes and creating an explosion hazard. The C-87 also had a tendency to enter an uncontrollable stall or spin when confronted with even mild icing conditions, a frequent occurrence over the Himalayas. Gann said they "could not carry enough ice to chill a highball".

The aircraft could also become unstable in flight if its center of gravity shifted due to improper cargo loading.  This longitudinal instability arose from the aircraft's hasty conversion from bomber to cargo transport.  Unlike a normal cargo transport, which was designed from the start with a contiguous cargo compartment with a safety margin for fore-and-aft loading variations, the bomb racks and bomb bays built into the B-24 design were fixed in position, greatly limiting the aircraft's ability to tolerate improper loading.  This problem was exacerbated by wartime exigencies and the failure of USAAF Air Transport Command to instruct loadmasters in the C-87's peculiarities. The design's roots as a bomber are also considered culpable for frequently collapsing nosegear; its strength was adequate for an aircraft that dropped its payload in flight before landing on a well-maintained runway, but it proved marginal for an aircraft making repeated hard landings on rugged unimproved airstrips while heavily loaded.

Despite its shortcomings and unpopularity among its crews, the C-87 was valued for the reliability of its Pratt & Whitney engines, superior speed that enabled it to mitigate significantly the effect of head and cross winds, a service ceiling that allowed it to surmount most weather fronts, and range that permitted its crews to fly "pressure-front" patterns that chased favorable winds. The C-87 was never fully displaced on the air routes by the Douglas C-54 Skymaster and Curtiss C-46 Commando, which offered similar performance combined with greater reliability and more benign flight characteristics. Some surviving C-87 aircraft were converted into VIP transports or flight crew trainers, and several others were sold to the Royal Air Force.

Variants
C-87
USAAF transport variant of the B-24D with seats for 25 passengers, 278 built.
C-87A
VIP version for 16 passengers, three for the USAAF and three to the United States Navy as RY-1.
C-87B
Proposed armed variant, not built.
XC-87B
Conversions with stretched forward compartment and LB-30 type low altitude power packages. Later PB4Y-2 type power packages and single tail (see RY-3/C-87C). 42–40355. (Total: 1 conversion)
C-87C
Proposed USAAF variant of the RY-3, designation not used.
RY-1
United States Navy designation for three former USAAF C-87As fitted for 16 passengers.
RY-2
Five former USAAF C-87s fitted for 20 passengers, a further 15 were cancelled.
RY-3
A C-87 with the single tail and seven foot fuselage stretch of the PB4Y-2 Privateer.  39 were built, and were used by the RAF Transport Command No. 231 Squadron, U.S. Marine Corps, and one was used by the RCAF.
AT-22
Five C-87s used for flight engineer training, later designated TB-24D.
Liberator C.IX
Royal Air Force designation for 26 RY-3s supplied under Lend-Lease. The designation meaning "Cargo (aircraft) Mark 9"

Accidents and incidents
The Aviation Safety Network, part of the Flight Safety Foundation, records 150 hull loss accidents involving the C-87 or the C-109 occurring between 1942 and 1964.

On November 30, 1943, a C–87 with a crew of four plus a passenger ran out of fuel from Kunming, China to Jorhat, India when it was blown off course by strong wind. All five onboard landed near Tsetang, Tibet and became one of the first Americans who have visited Lhasa.

The worst accident took place 25 July 1944. All 27 on board USAAF C.87 41-11706 were killed when it crashed on Florida Island in the south-west Pacific; the crew were civilian employees of Consairway and the passengers were high-ranking British and American officers, including Royal Air Force Air commodore Isaac John Fitch.

The next year, in July 1945 a Consolidated C-87 Liberator Express operated by the Royal Air Force bound for Manus Island failed to gain altitude after taking off from Sydney's now non-existent runway 22, struck trees and crashed into the ground in Brighton-Le-Sands. The aircraft exploded on impact, killing all 12 passengers and crew on board. The victims were from the British, Australian and New Zealand armed forces.

Another notable accident took place on 15 April 1957 when C-87 XA-KUN, operated by TAMSA (Transportes Aéreos Mexicanos SA), crashed after take-off from Mérida-Rejon Airport, killing all on board, including the famous Mexican actor and singer Pedro Infante.

Operators

Compañia Boliviana de Aviacion

Indian Air Force Two C-87 aircraft recovered from an aircraft dump in Kanpur formed No.102 Survey Flight.

TAMSA (Transportes Aéreos Mexicanos SA)

Royal Air Force
No. 231 Squadron RAF

United States Army Air Forces
United States Navy
United States Marine Corps

Specifications (C-87)

See also

References
Notes

Bibliography

 Andrade, John. U.S. Military Aircraft Designations and Serials since 1909. Hinckley, UK: Midland Counties Publications, 1979. .
 Baugher, Joe. "Consolidated C-87 Liberator Express". Joe Baugher's Encyclopedia of American Military Aircraft. Retrieved: 25 April 2006.
 Baugher, Joe. "Consolidated C-109". Joe Baugher's Encyclopedia of American Military Aircraft. Retrieved: 5 September 2008.
 Dorr, Robert F. Air Force One. New York: Zenith Imprint, 2002. .
Gann, Ernest K. Fate is the Hunter. New York: Simon & Schuster, 1961. .

External links

Popular Mechanics, November 1943, "Cutaway Drawing C-87"
 Wendell Willkie arriving in Cairo 1942 on C-87 "Gulliver"... note double cargo door of genuine C-87
 C-87 photo: on unknown remote field from Thomas McAvoy's 1944 Life essay, "Fireball Express to India"
 C-87 photo: cockpit view from Thomas McAvoy's 1944 Life essay, "Fireball Express to India"
 C-87 photo: nose loading hatch from Thomas McAvoy's 1944 Life essay, "Fireball Express to India"
 C-87 photo with vintage truck from Thomas McAvoy's 1944 Life essay, "Fireball Express to India"
 C-87 pilot's view of Taj Mahal as mentioned in Ernest K. Gann reference, McAvoy/Life

C-087
Consolidated C-087 Liberator Express
Consolidated C-87 Liberator Express
Four-engined tractor aircraft
High-wing aircraft
Aircraft first flown in 1942
Four-engined piston aircraft
Twin-tail aircraft